Armin Shimerman (born November 5, 1949) is an American actor and author.

Early life
Shimerman was born into a Jewish family in Lakewood, New Jersey, on November 5, 1949, the son of accountant Susan and house painter Herbert Shimerman. When he was 15, he moved with his family to Los Angeles, where his mother enrolled him in a drama group in an effort to expand his social circle. He attended Santa Monica High School and was active in drama. As a senior, he played leading roles in school productions of Hamlet, The Crucible, and The Skin of Our Teeth before graduating in 1967. After graduating from UCLA, he was selected to apprentice at the Old Globe Theater in San Diego. He began pursuing a career in theater and eventually moved to New York City, where he was a member of the Impossible Ragtime Theater. Returning to Los Angeles, he took roles in two CBS series to launch his television acting career.

Career

Acting

Television

Shimerman is known for his work as the Ferengi bar owner Quark in the long-running television series Star Trek: Deep Space Nine, though his involvement with the Star Trek franchise began with appearances as other Ferengi characters in the Star Trek: The Next Generation episodes "The Last Outpost" and "Peak Performance". As the character Quark, Shimerman became one of Star Trek's most widely known characters, and he appeared several times on the cover of TV Guide, either with other actors or alone as part of a collector's series. He says that his favorite episode of Deep Space Nine is "Little Green Men" as it was the only episode where he is shown captaining a ship.

Along with Patrick Stewart, Marina Sirtis, Jonathan Frakes, and John de Lancie, he is one of only a few actors to play the same character on four or more different Star Trek series. He played Quark in Star Trek: The Next Generation, Star Trek: Deep Space Nine, Star Trek: Voyager, and Star Trek: Lower Decks. He reprised the role of Quark in the 1998 film Star Trek: Insurrection, but only in deleted scenes.

In addition to Star Trek, Shimerman has had roles as Pascal on Beauty and the Beast and as Principal Snyder in 19 episodes of Buffy the Vampire Slayer. He has also starred as Anteaus in Stargate SG-1 as one of the Nox, an evil wizard in Charmed, appeared as Stan the caddy in an episode of Seinfeld and as Dr. Patemkin on Leverage.

Shimerman has appeared in the first 7 episodes as Judge Brian Hooper in the third season of Boston Legal, joining fellow Star Trek actors William Shatner, René Auberjonois, and Ethan Phillips. His character even shared a scene with Auberjonois, with the strife between the two characters reminiscent of the conflict between Shimerman's Quark and Auberjonois's Odo.

He made an appearance as "The Terror" in the first The Tick live-action series.

He appeared in the series Numb3rs episode "Provenance" as Patrick Holden. He had a small cameo in the episode "Posse Comitatus" of The West Wing as Richard the III and another in the film as an Old Man in the subway in What the Bleep Do We Know!?.

He has made appearances in various television series such as Babes as Mr. Ian Anderson, Married... with Children as Mr. Lovejoy, Warehouse 13 as Charlie Martin, Tremors as Cecil Carr, The Young and the Restless as Judge Graham Roberts, Castle as Benjamin Donnelly, Bad Samaritans as the Judge, and Red Bird as Max.

Voice work
He has voiced several video game villains, including Toad and Zealot (as well as the 5th Male Prisoner) in X-Men Legends and X-Men Legends II: Rise of Apocalypse respectively, Andrew Ryan in the BioShock series, Razputin's father in Psychonauts, and General Skarr from Evil Con Carne and The Grim Adventures of Billy and Mandy. He then lent his voice talent to BioWare for their games Jade Empire (as Emperor Sun Hai, Abbot Song and the Innkeeper) and Mass Effect (as the original Salarian Councilor and Fai Dan). He also voiced Dr. Emil Narud, Mohandar and Dr. Emil Narud in its Human Form in the 2010 RTS video game StarCraft II: Wings of Liberty and the 2013 expansion StarCraft II: Heart of the Swarm respectively.

He also voiced the role of Quark in various Deep Space Nine video games such as Harbinger and the Fallen and reprised the role in the 2018 expansion Star Trek Online: Victory is Life.

He also voiced Ben Robbins and the Shopkeeper in the first 2 episodes of Rocket Power from 1999 to 2000.

In 2008, he voiced the character of Wilmer in an audio dramatization of The Maltese Falcon that also featured actors Michael Madsen, Sandra Oh, and Edward Herrmann. In addition, he also voiced the character of Mr. Phillips in Focus on the Family Radio Theatre's production of Anne of Green Gables. He also voiced Raanu along with the Villager and a Village Leader in the straight-to-DVD animated film Bionicle: The Legend Reborn. He also voices Green Goblin in the action role-playing video game Marvel: Ultimate Alliance 2.

In 2011, he provided additional voices for the MMORPG Star Wars: The Old Republic.

In 2012, he also voiced Che Garcia Hansson and Old Joseph Cajiais for the MMORPG The Secret World.

His best known voice work is that of Doctor Nefarious in the Ratchet & Clank franchise, a role for which he received much praise.

He reprised his roles as Dr. Nefarious and Andrew Ryan and also voiced a Vox Populi enemy in the crossover fighting game PlayStation All-Stars Battle Royale.

Writing

Deep Space Nine
Shimerman co-authored a Star Trek: Deep Space Nine novel, The 34th Rule, with David R. George III, published January 1, 1999. It focuses on his character Quark, who loses his bar and is imprisoned as a result of a diplomatic crisis between the Bajoran and Ferengi governments. The novel is an allegory for the internment of Japanese Americans during the Second World War.

The Merchant Prince series
Shimerman has co-written a series of books in which he provides a science fictional basis for the life of Dr. John Dee. The first novel in the series, The Merchant Prince, was co-written with Irish author Michael Scott, known for his Nicholas Flamel series. Published in 2000, it features the historical figure John Dee being placed in suspended animation in 1575 by an alien race known as the Roc and awakening in 2099. The cover features Shimerman in Elizabethan garb. Shimerman commented: "John Dee really did exist. We're pretty sure he was a member of Queen Elizabeth's secret service, which put it in his purview to kill if he needed to. The Elizabethan period was a much more perilous time; you had to be quick with a dagger and nefarious in order to survive". Shimerman thought there were aspects of both himself and his Star Trek: Deep Space Nine character, Quark, in the novel's interpretation of John Dee. Shimerman commented: "There are aspects of Quark similar to Dr. Dee, and undoubtedly there are aspects of Dr. Dee similar to Armin Shimerman, which would make him seem like Quark as well".

The other novels in the series are Outrageous Fortune (2002), co-written with Chelsea Quinn Yarbro, known for her historical horror novels, and Capital Offense (2003).

In late 2020, Shimerman's new book, Illyria: Betrayal of Angels, was released by publisher Jumpmaster Press. Betrayal of Angels is the first book in Shimerman's trilogy about John Dee.

Teaching 
Shimerman has been teaching Shakespeare for years, and as an adjunct professor for the University of Southern California. He also serves as Shakespeare scholar for productions in and around the Los Angeles area.

Personal life
Shimerman married actress Kitty Swink in 1981.

Filmography

Film

Television

Podcast series

Video games

Soundtrack performances
Cop Rock (1990) - (performer: "He's Guilty") - Episode: "Pilot"
Star Trek: Deep Space Nine (1998) - (performer: "Slug-o-Cola" - uncredited) - Episode: "Profit and Lace"
What We Left Behind: Star Trek DS9 (2019) - (performer: "What We Left Behind")
Ratchet and Clank: Rift Apart (2021) - (performer: "Join Me at the Top")

Writer work
 Evil Con Carne (2004) - (story - segment "Hector, King of the Britons") - Episode: "Jealousy, Jealous Do/Hector, King of the Britons"

Audio work
 The 34th Rule (2000) - Narrator, Quark
 Star Trek: Deep Space Nine: Legends of the Ferengi (2001) - Narrator, Quark
 Incident at Vichy (2002) - First Detective, Prof. Hoffman
 Magic Time (2005) - Narration
 Twelve Angry Men (2006) - Juror #4
 The War of the Worlds (2007) - Announcer, Others
 The Maltese Falcon (2008) - Wilmer
 Adventures in Odyssey (2009) - Prince George
 The Mark of Zorro (2011) - Tavern Landlord
 Die, Snow White! Die, Damn You!: A Very Grimm Tale (2012) - The Magic Mirror
 Wild Cards IV: Aces Abroad (2016) - Narration
 Magic Time: an Audio Play (2017) - Sam Lungo

Broadway work
 Threepenny Opera (1976-1977) - Mr. Charles Filch, Ed, Ensemble
 Saint Joan (1977-1978) - Baudricourt's Steward, Page to Warwick, Thomas de Courcelles, The English Soldier, Ensemble
 I Remember Mama (1979) - Mr. Thorkelson
 The Play That Goes Wrong (2022) - Dennis Tyde, Perkins

Bibliography
 The 34th Rule (1998) (with David R. George III)
The Merchant Prince (2000) (with Michael Scott)
Outrageous Fortune (2002) (with Chelsea Quinn Yarbro)
Capital Offense (2003)
 Betrayal of Angels (2020)

References

External links

 
 
 Bio @ Starfleetlibrary.com
 QUARK'S RENAISSANCE: Armin Shimerman Pens Novel About Philosopher John Dee
 An Interview with Armin Shimerman by Buffering the Vampire Slayer, A Buffy the Vampire Slayer Podcast, 19 November 2016.

1949 births
Living people
Male actors from New Jersey
American male film actors
American male television actors
American male voice actors
Audiobook narrators
Male actors from Los Angeles
People from Lakewood Township, New Jersey
University of California, Los Angeles alumni
Jewish American male actors
21st-century American Jews